Shaun Nichols (born 7 February 1964) is an American professor of philosophy at Cornell University specializing in the philosophy of cognitive sciences, moral psychology and philosophy of mind.

Education and career
Nichols received his PhD in philosophy from Rutgers in 1992 under the supervision of Stephen Stich and his BA in philosophy from Stanford.  He is a leading contributor to experimental philosophy and was awarded the Stanton Prize by the Society for Philosophy and Psychology in 2005.

He taught at the College of Charleston, University of Arizona and, since 2019, Cornell University.

Philosophical work

His early work was concerned primarily with questions in the theory of mind and the nature of imagination.

Nichols's current research projects are in experimental philosophy, moral psychology, bayesian cognitive science, cultural evolution, free will, and the self.

Experimental philosophy
In his work within experimental philosophy, Nichols has addressed questions about cross-cultural differences in semantic intuitions, free will, intentional action, the nature of moral judgment, and a number of other key philosophical concepts.

Bibliography

Authored
Nichols, S. 2004. Sentimental Rules: On the Natural Foundations of Moral Judgment. New York: Oxford University Press. 
Nichols, S. and Stich, S. 2003. Mindreading: An Integrated Account of Pretense, Self-awareness and Understanding Other Minds. Oxford: Oxford University Press.

Edited
Knobe, J. & Nichols, S. 2008. Experimental Philosophy. New York: Oxford University Press. 
Nichols, S. 2006. The Architecture of the Imagination: New Essays on Pretense, Possibility, and Fiction. Oxford: Oxford University Press. 
Nadelhoffer, T., Nahmias, E., & Nichols, S. 2012. Moral Psychology: Historical and Contemporary Readings. Malden, MA: John Wiley & Sons

See also
American philosophy
List of American philosophers

References

External links
Shaun Nichols homepage
Video (and audio) of interview/conversation with Nichols by Will Wilkinson on Bloggingheads.tv

Living people
Philosophers from Arizona
University of Arizona faculty
Stanford University alumni
Rutgers University alumni
21st-century American philosophers
Moral psychologists
1964 births